This is a list of Spanish viceroys (also called lieutenants) of the Principality of Catalonia from 1479 to 1713.

1479–1493: Enrique de Aragón 
1493–1495: Juan de Lanuza y Garabito
1495–1496: Juan Fernández de Heredia
1496–1501: Juan de Aragón, Conde de Ribagorza
1501–1514: Jaime de Luna 
1514–1521: Alonso de Aragón, Archbishop of Zaragoza
1521–1523: Pere Folc de Cardona, Archbishop of Tarragona
1523–1525: Antonio de Zúñiga, Prior of Castile, Order of Saint John of Jerusalem
1525–1539: Fadrique de Portugal y Noroña, Bishop of Sigüenza 
1539–1543: Saint Francis Borgia, 4th Duke of Gandia, 3rd General Father of the Jesuit Order 
1543–1554: Juan Fernández Manrique de Lara, Marqués de Aguilar de Campoo 
1554–1558: Pedro Afán de Ribera, Duque de Alcalá
1558–1564: García Álvarez de Toledo, 4th Marquis of Villafranca del Bierzo 
1564–1571: Diego Hurtado de Mendoza y de la Cerda 
1571–1580: Fernando de Toledo 
1580–1581: Francisco de Moncada y Folc de Cardona, Marqués de Aytona 
1581–1583: Carlo d'Aragona Tagliavia  
1583–1586: Juan de Zúñiga y Avellaneda, Conde de Miranda del Castañar 
1586–1590: Manrique de Lara y Girón, Conde de Valencia de Don Juan  
1590–1592: Pedro Luis Galcerán de Borja y de Castro-Pinós 
1592–1596: Bernardino de Cárdenas y Portugal, Duque de Maqueda 
1596–1602: Lorenzo Suárez de Figueroa y Córdoba, Duque de Feria 
1602–1603: Joan Terès i Borrull, Archbishop of Tarragona 
1603–1611: Héctor de Pignatelli y Colonna, Duque de Monteleón 
1611–1611: Pedro Manrique, Bishop of Tortosa 
1611–1615: Francisco Hurtado de Mendoza, Marqués de Almazán 
1615–1619: Francisco Fernández de la Cueva, 7th Duke of Alburquerque 
1619–1622: Fernando Afán de Ribera y Téllez-Girón, 3rd Duke of Alcalá de los Gazules 
1622–1626: Juan Sentís, Bishop of Barcelona 
1626–1627: Luis Diez de Aux de Armendáriz, Bishop of Urgel 
1627–1629: Miguel Santos de San Pedro, Bishop of Solsona 
1629–1630: Gómez Suárez de Figueroa, 3rd Duke of Feria
1630–1632: Enrique de Aragón Folc de Cardona y Córdoba
1632–1633: Cardinal-Infante Fernando de Austria 
1633–1638: Enrique de Aragón Folc de Cardona y Córdoba (2nd time)
1638–1640: Dalmau de Queralt, Count of Santa Coloma
1640–1640: García Gil Manrique, Bishop of Barcelona 
1640–1640: Enrique de Aragón Folc de Cardona y Córdoba (3rd time)
1640–1642: Pedro Fajardo Requesens y Zúñiga, Marqués de los Vélez
1642–1644: Pedro Antonio de Aragón
1642–1644: Felipe de Silva 
1644–1645: Andrea Cantelmo
1645–1647: Diego Felipez de Guzmán, Marquis of Leganés
1647–1648: Guillermo Ramón de Moncada, Marqués de Aytona 
1648–1650: Juan de Garay 
1650–1653: Francisco de Orozco, Marqués de Mortara
1653–1656: John of Austria the Younger
1656–1663: Francisco de Orozco, Marqués de Mortara (2nd time)
1663–1664: Francisco de Moura y Corterreal, Marqués de Castel Rodrigo 
1664–1667: Vicente de Gonzaga y Doria
1667–1669: Gaspar Téllez-Girón, 5th Duke de Osuna 
1669–1673: Francisco Fernández de Córdoba, Duque de Sessa
1673–1675: Francisco de Tutavilla y del Rufo, Duque de San Germán 
1675–1676: Juan Antonio Pacheco Osorio Toledo, Marqués de Cerralbo 
1676–1677: Alexander Farnese, Prince of Parma
1677–1678: Juan Domingo Méndez de Haro y Fernández de Córdoba 
1678–1678: Diego Dávila Mesía y Guzmán, 3rd Marquis of Leganés
1678–1685: Alejandro de Bournonville, Duque de Bournonville 
1685–1688: Diego Dávila Mesía y Guzmán, 3rd Marquis of Leganés (2nd time)
1688–1688: Juan Tomás Enríquez de Cabrera, Conde de Melga
1688–1690: Carlos de Gurrea Aragón y Borja, Duque de Villahermosa 
1690–1693: Juan Alonso Pérez de Guzmán, Duque de Medina Sidonia 
1693–1694: Juan Manuel Fernández Pacheco, 8th Marquis of Villena 
1694–1696: Francisco Antonio de Agurto, Marquis of Gastañaga 
1696–1698: Francisco de Velasco y Tovar, Conde de Melgar
1698–1701: Jorge de Hesse-Darmstadt, Landgrave of Hesse

During the War of the Spanish Succession, Catalonia was contested between the Bourbons and Habsburgs.

Viceroys named by Philip V of Spain:
1702–1703: Luis Fernández de Portocarrero, Conde de Palma
1703–1705: Francisco de Velasco y Tovar, Conde de Melgar (2nd time)
1705–1706: José Antonio de Mendoza, 3rd Marquis of Villagarcía 
1706–1713: Claude François Bidal d'Asfeld

Viceroys named by Archduke Charles:
1711–1712: Elisabeth Christine of Brunswick-Wolfenbüttel
1713–1713: Guido von Starhemberg

In 1713, by the Nueva Planta decrees, King Philip V of Spain replaced the function Viceroy of Catalonia, with that of Captain General of Catalonia.

French viceroys during the Reapers' War 
During the Reapers' War or Catalan Revolt, the French occupied Catalonia and appointed viceroys to govern the territory in the name of the King of France, recognized as Count of Barcelona by the Catalan institutions.

1641–1642: Urbain de Maillé-Brézé
1642–1645: Philippe de La Mothe-Houdancourt  (1st time)
1645–1647: Henri, Count of Harcourt
1647–1647: Louis II de Bourbon, Prince of Condé
1647–1648: Cardinal Mazarin
1649–1651: Louis de Bourbon, Duke of Mercœur
1651–1652: Philippe de La Mothe-Houdancourt  (2nd time)

References

External links
 Virreinato de Cataluña

 
Viceroys
Viceroys
Catalonia